Manu Nayyar (born 9 May 1964) is an Indian former cricketer. He played 57 first-class matches for Delhi between 1986 and 1994. He is now working as a referee.

See also
 List of Delhi cricketers

References

External links
 

1964 births
Living people
Indian cricketers
Delhi cricketers
Cricketers from Delhi